Bruce Loyola Ryan (1921–2002) was an Australian rugby league footballer who played in the 1940s and 1950s.

Playing career
Ryan was a champion school-boy sprinter, before being graded at the Newtown in 1940. He went on to play six seasons for Newtown but his career was interrupted by World War II, during which he served in the Australian Army and later the Royal Australian Air Force. While he played for the Jets he was part of the squad that won the 1943 Grand Final. He also played in the team that were defeated in the 1944 Grand Final.

After retiring from Newtown at the end of the 1947 season, he travelled to England to join Hull F.C. for the 1947–1948 season, where he was met by 4,000 fans waiting to greet him at Paragon Station. He went on to play for three seasons, scoring 60 tries in 84 games. Ryan transferred to Leeds for a then world record fee of £4,750, where he played for two seasons, scoring 42 tries in 57 games.

Post playing
He later joined the coaching staff of North Sydney in 1956.

Ryan died on 25 June 2002, 12 days before his 81st birthday.

References

1921 births
2002 deaths
Australian Army personnel of World War II
Australian rugby league players
Hull F.C. players
Leeds Rhinos players
Newtown Jets players
North Sydney Bears coaches
Royal Australian Air Force personnel of World War II
Rugby league players from Sydney
Rugby league wingers